Mansha Pasha (Urdu: منشاء پاشا; born October 19, 1987) is a Pakistani actress and television presenter. She is known for her supporting roles in several critically and commercially successful television series, including Shehr-e-Zaat (2012), Madiha Maliha (2012), Zindagi Gulzar Hai (2013), Virasat (2013) and Mera Naam Yusuf Hai (2015). She played Zoya in ARY Digital's comedy series Aangan (2017). Pasha made her debut in films with the romantic comedy Chalay Thay Saath (2017), and gained critical success with the crime thriller Laal Kabootar (2019) which earner her nomination for Best Actress at Pakistan International Screen Awards. She is also the recipient of Hum Award.

Personal life
Pasha was born in Hyderabad. She has three sisters, which are Zeenat Pasha, Hannah Pasha, and Maria Pasha. Pasha resides in Karachi with her family.

Pasha was married to businessman Asad Farooqi from 2013 to 2018. In 2021, she married politician and human rights activist Jibran Nasir.

Career
Pasha's first acting appearance was a minor role in two episodes of the 2011 Hum TV's romantic series Humsafar where she played a role of Ayesha (Khirad's friend) and followed with another minor role in Shehr-e-Zaat as Rashna (Falak's friend) and as Nisha in Madiha Maliha.

She received praise for a supporting role of Sidra in 2012 series Zindagi Gulzar Hai which was a commercially and critically hit and proves to be the breakthrough for her. She then starred in supporting roles in several acclaim television series, including Virasat (2013),  Ek Aur Ek Dhai (2013),  Kitni Girhain Baaki Hain (2013), Shareek-e-Hayat (2013). Her performance in the romantic series Mohabat Subh Ka Sitara Hai (2013) earned her Hum Award for Best Supporting Actress.

In 2014, Pasha played a leading role of Zara in Zara aur Mehrunnisa, Fiza in Shehr-e-Ajnabi, Sehrish in Hum Tehray Gunahgaar, Rumana in  Lafangey Parindey and Aqsa in Mere Apne. In 2015, she first worked with Sadia Jabbar on the romantic series alongside Imran Abbas and Maya Ali. The serial received positive response from critics, and performed well commercially. She then starred as Sanam in a family drama Bewafai Tumhare Naam and appeared as Nusrat in a romantic soap Daraar and as Samra in Tumhare Siwa.

Pasha starred in three television series in 2016. She first paired opposite Babar Ali in Babar Javed's Wafa. She then collaborated with Junaid Khan and Imran Ashraf in Dil-e-Beqarar and Jhoot respectively.

In 2017, she starred in the family drama Aangan, the romances Jalti Rait Per,  the revenge drama Khudgarz and the romances Tau Dil Ka Kia Hua. The same year she also directed the Six-part series with Elaj Trust which tackles a topic of Post-partum depression.

In 2019, she starred in two television plays, Juda Na Hona and Surkh Chandni,   where she played antagonist for first time.

She then starred in Mohabbat Tujhe Alvida alongside Zahid Ahmed and Sonya Hussyn in 2020.

She will be next seen in Yasir Hussain's directional Koyal alongside Fahad Shaikh.

Filmography

Television

Other appearances

Accolades

References

External links
 Mansha Pasha's official blog
 
 

1987 births
Living people
Sindhi people
Pakistani television actresses
Actresses from Karachi
21st-century Pakistani actresses